Marian Kiliński (2 July 1904 – 19 April 1995) was a Polish footballer. He played in one match for the Poland national football team in 1924.

References

External links
 

1904 births
1995 deaths
Polish footballers
Poland international footballers
Place of birth missing
Association footballers not categorized by position